Tetropium abietis is a species of beetle in the family Cerambycidae. It was described by Fall in 1912.

References

Spondylidinae
Beetles described in 1912